Khaneh Hay Nazer Saheb Khan (also Romanized as Khāneh Hāy Naz̧er Şāḩeb Khān) is a village in Margan Rural District, in the Central District of Hirmand County, Sistan and Baluchestan Province, Iran. At the 2006 census, its population was 174, in 38 families.

References 

Populated places in Hirmand County